Spragueia perstructana is a moth of the family Noctuidae first described by Francis Walker in 1865. It is found from the United States (including Maryland, South Carolina, Florida and Texas), south to the Caribbean (including Cuba Puerto Rico and the British Virgin Islands) and Central America, including Costa Rica.

The wingspan is about 15 mm.

The larvae feed on Lantana camara.

References

Moths described in 1865
Acontiinae